JS Kumano (FFM-2) is the second ship of the Mogami-class frigate of the Japan Maritime Self-Defense Force (JMSDF). She was named after Kumano River and shares her name with a World War II heavy cruiser Kumano and Cold War destroyer escort Kumano.

Development and design 

In 2015, the Japanese defense budget allocated funds to study the construction of a new “compact-type hull destroyer with additional multi-functional capabilities” as well as a new radar system for the destroyer. In the same year Mitsubishi Heavy Industries (MHI) unveiled the frigate's first concept model (30FF) which they have been developing with their own funds.

Weapons include a Mk 45 gun, two remote weapon station above the bridge, 16 Mk 41 VLS at the bow, 8 anti-ship missiles, one SeaRAM, an SH-60L helicopter, torpedoes, and decoy launchers. It can also deploy and recover UUV, USV, and sea mines from the rear ramp beneath the helideck. It is also expected to use a naval version of the Type 03 Chū-SAM.

Construction and career
Kumano was laid down on 30 October 2019 at Mitsui Engineering and Shipbuilding, Tamano and launched on 19 November 2020. She will be expected to be commissioned in March 2022.

While fitting out, her enclosed antenna was installed on 16 February 2021.

She began sea trials August 24, 2021 with likely missions of island defense, homeland patrol, and international tours.

Kumano was commissioned on 22 March 2022 and deployed to Yokosuka Naval Base.

When JS Kumano was completed, it was not equipped with VLS, but the budget for VLS will be appropriated later and VLS will be installed.

Gallery

References

External links 

2020 ships
Ships built by Mitsui Engineering and Shipbuilding
Mogami-class frigates